Shawn Michael Armstrong (born September 11, 1990) is an American professional baseball pitcher for the Tampa Bay Rays of Major League Baseball (MLB). He has previously played in MLB for the Cleveland Indians, Seattle Mariners, Baltimore Orioles, and Miami Marlins.

Early life
Armstrong attended West Craven High School in Vanceboro, North Carolina. He was a member of the varsity baseball team for his entire high school career and participated in cross country for two seasons. The Houston Astros selected Armstrong in the 33rd round of the 2008 MLB draft, but he did not sign. He then enrolled at East Carolina University (ECU), where he played college baseball for the ECU Pirates. He missed the 2009 season after having shoulder surgery, and finished his collegiate career with a 4-3 win–loss record and a 4.45 earned run average (ERA).

Career

Cleveland Indians
The Cleveland Indians selected Armstrong in the 18th round of the 2011 MLB draft. In 2012, Armstrong pitched for the Carolina Mudcats of the Class A-Advanced Carolina League. He was named a Carolina League All-Star. He ended the year with a 2.06 ERA. He missed the beginning of the 2013 with an injury, and had a 4.14 ERA on the season after he returned to health. In 2014, he pitched for the Akron RubberDucks of the Class AA Eastern League. He was named an Eastern League All-Star. After the 2014 season, the Indians added Armstrong to their 40-man roster. Armstrong pitched for the Columbus Clippers of the Class AAA International League in 2015, and was named to the Triple-A All-Star Game.

Armstrong was called up to the major leagues for the first time on August 8, 2015. Armstrong made his major league debut the same night, pitching a scoreless ninth inning with two strikeouts. He finished his rookie season with a 2.25 ERA across eight appearances. In 2016, Armstrong logged a 2.53 ERA with 7 strikeouts in 10 appearances for the Indians. In 2017, he pitched in 22 games for Cleveland, recording a 4.38 ERA with 20 strikeouts in 24.2 innings pitched.

Seattle Mariners
On December 13, 2017, the Indians traded Armstrong to the Seattle Mariners for international bonus pool money. In 2018 with Seattle, Armstrong pitched to a neat 1.23 ERA with 15 strikeouts in 14.2 innings pitched. On March 18, 2019, Armstrong was placed on the disabled list with an oblique injury. Armstrong was designated for assignment on April 26 after struggling to a 14.73 ERA in 4 appearances to begin the year.

Baltimore Orioles
On April 28, 2019, Armstrong was claimed off waivers by the Baltimore Orioles. Armstrong recorded a 5.13 ERA in 51 appearances for the Orioles in 2019.

In 2020, Armstrong pitched in 14 games for the Orioles, notching a 1.80 ERA and 14 strikeouts to go along with a 2–0 record over 15.0 innings pitched.

After struggling to an 8.55 ERA in 20 appearances in 2021, Armstrong was designated for assignment by the Orioles on June 4, 2021. He was outrighted to the Triple-A Norfolk Tides on June 11.

Tampa Bay Rays
On July 30, 2021, Armstrong was traded to the Tampa Bay Rays in exchange for cash considerations. On August 17, the Rays selected Armstrong's contract. Armstrong made 11 appearances for the Rays, posting a 4.50 ERA with 22 strikeouts. Armstrong was designated for assignment by the Rays on September 12. On October 8, Armstrong elected free agency.

Miami Marlins
On March 13, 2022, Armstrong signed a minor league contract with the Miami Marlins. On April 7, the Marlins selected Armstrong's contract, adding him to their opening day roster. He was designated for assignment on May 2, 2022, then elected free agency two days later.

Tampa Bay Rays (second stint)
On May 10, 2022, Armstrong signed a minor league deal with the Tampa Bay Rays. He was selected to the major league roster on May 31.

References

External links

1990 births
Living people
Sportspeople from New Bern, North Carolina
Baseball players from North Carolina
Major League Baseball pitchers
Cleveland Indians players
Seattle Mariners players
Baltimore Orioles players
Tampa Bay Rays players
Miami Marlins players
East Carolina Pirates baseball players
Mahoning Valley Scrappers players
Lake County Captains players
Carolina Mudcats players
Akron Aeros players
Scottsdale Scorpions players
Arizona League Indians players
Surprise Saguaros players
Akron RubberDucks players
Columbus Clippers players
Tacoma Rainiers players
Norfolk Tides players
Durham Bulls players